Ban Hong is a district (amphoe) of Lamphun province, northern Thailand.

History
The minor district (king amphoe) Ban Hong was established in 1917, when it was split off from Pa Sang district. It was upgraded to a full district on 24 June 1956.

Geography
Neighboring districts are (from the north clockwise): Wiang Nong Long, Pa Sang, Mae Tha, Thung Hua Chang and Li of Lamphun Province, Hot and Chom Thong of Chiang Mai province .

Administration
The district is divided into five sub-districts (tambons), which are further subdivided into 59 villages (mubans). Ban Hong is a township (thesaban tambon) which covers parts of tambon Ban Hong. There are a further five tambon administrative organizations (TAO).

References

External links
amphoe.com (Thai)

Ban Hong